Jean-Guy Couture (6 May 1929 – 2 January 2022) was a Canadian Roman Catholic prelate. He was a diocesan bishop of Chicoutimi, having served from 1979 to 2004.

Biography
Native to the Paroisse Saint-Jean-Baptiste de Québec, Couture was ordained on 30 May 1953 following his studies at the Petit Séminaire de Québec. He became Bishop of Hauterive, having been consecrated on 15 May 1975 by Maurice Roy. In 1979, Pope John Paul II named him Bishop of Chicoutimi. He retired in 2004, having reached the age of 75. His motto was "Charity, Joy, Peace".

Couture died on 2 January 2022, at the age of 92.

References

1929 births
2022 deaths
20th-century Roman Catholic bishops in Canada
21st-century Roman Catholic bishops in Canada
French Quebecers
Members of the Order of Canada
People from Quebec City
Université Laval alumni